Giovanni Frangipane (9 February 1902 – 1967) was an Italian sprinter and football player.

Biography
He competed in the men's 100 metres and the 4x100 metres relay events at the 1924 Summer Olympics. As of 2012, his results at the 100 metres Olympic event in 1924 (semi-finals) are the best result of an Italian athlete in this event. He was also a football player for Palermo from 1919 to 1929.

Olympic results

References

External links

Report on Italian Olympic athletes 

1902 births
1967 deaths
Athletes (track and field) at the 1924 Summer Olympics
Italian male sprinters
Olympic athletes of Italy
Sportspeople from Palermo
Footballers from Palermo
Italian footballers
Palermo F.C. players
Association footballers not categorized by position